Nalini (born 28 August 1964) is an Indian actress known for her works in Tamil, Malayalam, Kannada and Telugu films and worked in television.

Personal life
Nalini was born 28 August 1964 as second among eight children to Moorthi and Prema at Tamil Nadu. Her father was a choreographer in Tamil movies and her mother was a professional dancer. She has 7 siblings, one sister and six brothers. She studied at TN government school until grade seven; she could not continue her studies as she became busy with movies.

Nalini married actor Ramarajan in 1987. The couple have twins; Aruna and Arun, born in 1988. However, they divorced, citing differences in 2000. Her daughter Aruna married Ramesh Subramanian on 6 May 2013.

Filmography

Tamil films

Telugu films

Kannada films

Malayalam films

Television

Serials

Shows

References

External links

Living people
Place of birth missing (living people)
Actresses in Kannada cinema
Actresses in Malayalam cinema
Actresses in Tamil cinema
Actresses in Telugu cinema
Indian film actresses
1964 births
20th-century Indian actresses
21st-century Indian actresses
Indian television actresses
Actresses in Telugu television
Actresses in Tamil television
Actresses in Malayalam television